James Norman Goodier (October 17, 1905 – November 5, 1969) was professor of applied mechanics at Stanford University known for his work in elasticity and plastic deformation.

He was born in Preston, Lancashire, England and studied engineering at Cambridge University. He was awarded a Commonwealth Fund Fellowship which enabled him to continue his studies  at the University of Michigan where he earned his doctorate in 1931 under the direction of Stephen Timoshenko with a dissertation titled Compression of Rectangular Blocks, and the Bending of Beams by Nonlinear Distributions of Bending Forces.
Timoshenko moved to Stanford University in 1936 and Goodier eventually succeeded him there.

He was co-author of two classic books in this field:"Theory of Elasticity," with Timoshenko, 1951; and "Elasticity and Plasticity," with P. G.
Hodge, Jr., 1958 and was awarded the Timoshenko Medal by the American Society of Mechanical Engineers in 1961. He was chairman of the Applied Mechanics Division of the American Society of Mechanical Engineers from 1945 to 1946, and was elected Fellow of that Society in 1964. He had more than fifty doctoral students, two of whom were George F. Carrier and Nils Otto Myklestad.

References

External links

 J. N. Goodier Papers
 Stanford Daily News, November 7, 1969. http://stanforddailyarchive.com/cgi-bin/stanford?a=d&d=stanford19691107-01.2.11 Retrieved March 8, 2015.

1905 births
1969 deaths
Stanford University School of Engineering faculty
English mechanical engineers
Engineers from Preston, Lancashire
Alumni of the University of Cambridge
University of Michigan alumni